Tenacibaculum caenipelagi is a Gram-negative, aerobic, non-spore-forming and rod-shaped bacterium from the genus of Tenacibaculum which has been isolated from tidal flat sediments from Korea.

References 

Flavobacteria
Bacteria described in 2014